Emmanuel Chinwenwo Aguma (died 10 August 2018) was a Nigerian politician and lawyer from Rivers State, a long-term member People's Democratic Party. He was the Attorney General and Commissioner of Justice in the state. Between 2000 and 2002 Aguma worked as Secretary of the Nigerian Bar Association, Port Harcourt Branch, and also chaired the Bar from 2006 to 2008. On 10 July 2015, the Legal Practitioners Privileges Committee conferred the rank of Senior Advocate of Nigeria (SAN) on him alongside 20 others, to be sworn in on 21 September 2015.

See also
List of people from Rivers State
Judiciary of Rivers State

References

20th-century births
2018 deaths
Attorneys General of Rivers State
Rivers State Commissioners of Justice
Rivers State lawyers
Rivers State Peoples Democratic Party politicians
Lawyers from Port Harcourt
First Wike Executive Council
Senior Advocates of Nigeria
Board members of the Greater Port Harcourt City Development Authority